Bongu is a Madang language spoken in Madang Province, Papua New Guinea.

Examples of words

Russian loan words
Unlike other indigenous languages of Oceania, the Bongu language has several loan words from Russian.

References

Mindjim languages
Languages of Madang Province